Orland Francis Smith (November 5, 1905 – August 14, 1977) was an American football player. 

Smith was born in 1905 in Gorham, Maine. He attended Brockton High School in Massachusetts.  He then attended Brown University where he played college football from 1924 to 1926. He was selected by the Associated Press as a third-team player, and by Collier's Weekly  as a second-team player, on the 1926 College Football All-America Team. He played at defensive tackle and offensive guard for Brown and was described in December 1926 as "fast and aggressive" and "one of the fastest and most versatile forwards of the year."

Smith also played at the tackle position in the National Football League (NFL) for the Providence Steam Roller from 1927 to 1929. He appeared in 31 NFL games, 15 of them as a starter. Smith was attending medical school at Boston University during the week while playing in the NFL on Sundays.

Smith died in 1977 in Providence, Rhode Island.

References

1905 births
1977 deaths
All-American college football players
American football tackles
Brown Bears football players
Providence Steam Roller players
Players of American football from Maine
People from Gorham, Maine